Pub Philosophy is a term sometimes used to describe organised gatherings in public houses for philosophical discussion. Several series of events in the United Kingdom and elsewhere offer pub philosophy in a variety of formats, typically involving an invited speaker and some degree of open discussion. Among the more long-standing of these are:

Big Ideas (based in London, UK) https://web.archive.org/web/20100912055756/http://bigi.org.uk/
Kant's Cave (held in London, UK, by Philosophy For All)
Living Philosophy (based in Tintern, Wales UK)
PhiloMadrid (based in Madrid, Spain)
Philosophy In Pubs (based in Liverpool, UK) http://www.philosophyinpubs.co.uk
PIPS Brighton (based in Brighton, UK) http://www.pips-brighton.org.uk/
The Stoa (based in Faversham, Kent, UK)
Skeptics in the Pub
Thinking While Drinking (based in San Diego, California) http://thinkingwhiledrinking.org

Pub Philosophy groups, while often run by amateurs, have sometimes been recruited by more mainstream institutions to provide a distinctively participatory public forum. Such alliances have included Tate Liverpool and University of Chester working with Philosophy in Pubs, the Brighton Science Festival 2010 working with PIPS Brighton and the London School of Economics producing an event in collaboration with Big Ideas.

See also

List of public house topics
Café Philosophique
SAPERE
Socrates Cafe
Viennese café

References

External links
Big Ideas
Kant's Cave
PIPS Brighton
Philosophy In Pubs National
Living Philosophy
PhiloMadrid
Faversham Stoa
Skeptics in the Pub
Kingston Philosophy Cafe
Thinking While Drinking

Philosophy education
Philosophy events
Philosophy organizations
Pubs
Public philosophy